On Patrol: Live is an American reality television and docuseries that airs on the cable and satellite television network Reelz. It follows camera crews going on ride-alongs with law enforcement agencies in the United States. The series is an unofficial revival of Live PD which aired on A&E from 2016 to 2020 and was cancelled following the murder of George Floyd and killing of Javier Ambler.

Discussions about reviving the series took place between producers and numerous networks from 2020 to 2022. After being announced in June 2022, it premiered on July 22. On Patrol: Live is hosted by Dan Abrams and retired Tulsa Police Department Lieutenant Sean "Sticks" Larkin, who both returned from Live PD, along with newcomer Curtis Wilson, a deputy with the Richland County Sheriff's Department.

A&E later filed suit against the series, network, and production companies claiming copyright infringement. Despite strong performance in viewing figures and frequently winning its targeted age demographic, the revival was met with controversy in terms of how it portrays policing and in comparison to Live PD.

A companion series containing a preview of each night's show, called On Patrol: First Shift, airs an hour before On Patrol: Live; it premiered on August 12, 2022. An additional 90-episodes of the series was ordered in February 2023.

Overview
On Patrol: Live initially followed eight law enforcement agencies live in Marion County, Florida; Volusia County, Florida; Beech Grove, Indiana, Nye County, Nevada; Paterson, New Jersey; Bernalillo County, New Mexico; Richland County, South Carolina; and Berkeley County, South Carolina. In October 2022 an additional department in Daytona Beach, Florida, signed a one-year deal to appear on the series. A police department in Toledo, Ohio joined the series the same month. In December 2022, the department in Toledo was replaced by the Spotsylvania County, Virginia Sheriff's Office. The live broadcasts are supplemented by additional footage recorded by camera crews throughout the preceding week. Commentary is provided by host Dan Abrams alongside analysts Sean "Sticks" Larkin and Curtis Wilson. Captain Danny Brown and Master Deputy Addy Perez, both with Richland County, co-hosted separate episodes of the series with Abrams, Larkin, and Wilson. Brown's appearance coincided with the first "Citizen Ride Along" while Perez appeared after her resignation from the department. Additional segments in each episode include "Missing", for which the series partners with the National Center for Missing & Exploited Children and the Black and Missing Foundation, "Crime of the Night" (originally titled "Crime of the Week"), and "Wanted".

Production

Background

A&E television network pulled four original episodes of Live PD from the schedule that were set to air the weekend of May 29–30, and June 5–6, 2020. At the time, A&E cited the May 25 murder of George Floyd and subsequent protests as the primary reason stating it was "out of respect for the families of George Floyd and others who have lost their lives". On June 9, host Dan Abrams stated in a tweet "all of us associated with the show are as committed to it as ever" and was confident the series would return to air. A day later on June 10, it was reported that the network had destroyed footage of police action in the killing of Javier Ambler. The series had routinely been filming additional footage outside of its live broadcast for later use, and was riding-along with the Williamson County Sheriff's Department on the day of the killing. After the initial investigation had concluded producers followed policy and destroyed the footage on the orders of Sheriff Robert Chody, an action for which he was later charged. As a response to the two incidents, and Paramount Network's cancelling of Cops, A&E and production company Big Fish Entertainment jointly decided to cancel the series and its associated programs with the possibility to reboot it in the future.

Development
Despite its cancellation, Live PD had previously been renewed for an additional 160 episodes a month earlier. Its timeslot was later filled by spin-off series Live Rescue. In August 2020, Abrams reported that he was actively advocating for the series to return. Abrams also said that "active discussions" to bring Live PD back were occurring and its return would have protocol changes. These reports by Abrams continued into 2021 when he said it would return that year. This statement was partially retracted in December, when Abrams said other networks had expressed interest in the series, but that he still hoped to see a future return. In the year following the cancellation, A&E's viewership dropped 49% becoming the twentieth ranked ad-supported cable channel by total viewers, compared to its previous rank of eighth. Abrams confirmed once more in March 2022 that these conversations were still ongoing and that it would be unlikely to air on his Law&Crime television network due to budget constraints.

In June 2022, it was announced that the series had been revived under the title On Patrol: Live and would air on Reelz. Reelz signed a multi-year commitment for the series containing a "significant episode guarantee", with a network executive mentioning it was "the biggest commitment we've ever made". Similar to Live PD the series follows police officers on patrol and broadcasts their encounters live. A new aspect of On Patrol: Live includes local citizens also riding-along with the law enforcement officers and media crews. The series airs on a time delay that can last up to thirty minutes for "safety and security purposes", any footage obtained earlier than that is mentioned on air. Dan Abrams and former Tulsa Police Department lieutenant Sean "Sticks" Larkin returned to host. Tom Morris Jr. was unable to return due to scheduling and was replaced by Curtis Wilson. Wilson is a sheriff's deputy with the Richland County Sheriff's Department and was suggested for the role by Morris; Wilson had previously been involved with Live PDs "Wanted" segments. Abrams, who also retained his role as executive producer on the series, said "more exceptions" would be made in deciding which footage to retain past the 30-day policy, believing that the previous rules were too strict. Abrams also stated that the series would be more focused on transparency than Live PD was. John Zito, also returning from Live PD, alongside Paul Gordon and Joe Venafro are additional executive producers. MGM Television's Big Fish Entertainment returned as a production company under its new subsidiary, Half Moon Pictures, which "is focused on crime and investigative content".

On Patrol: Live was renewed for an additional 90-episodes on February 14, which is set to keep the series on the air through January 2024. The initial 60-episode order would have expired with the with the February 25, 2023, episode of the series.

A&E Networks lawsuit
A&E Networks, the parent company of the A&E network, filed a lawsuit in August 2022, against Reelz, Big Fish Entertainment, and Half Moon Pictures, alleging that it was a "blatant rip-off" of Live PD, infringed on their intellectual property, and calling for the series to stop production. According to the court filing, A&E retained all rights to commission new episodes of the series and had not authorized Reelz or Big Fish Entertainment to continue production. Prior to its airing A&E sent Reelz cease-and-desist letters which they say were ignored, with the exception of a name change from its working title of PD Live, a reverse of Live PD. The lawsuit further says that On Patrol: Live features many of the same segments as Live PD; as well as similar graphics, captions, and credits. It also mentions that the series airs in the same timeslot, tarnishes A&E's reputation as a result of technical difficulties, and confuses viewers due to news articles describing it as an official revival. Reelz responded to a request for comment stating that "ReelzChannel, LLC, has not been served with nor had an opportunity to review the Complaint in detail, and thus has no comment at this time beyond denying liability and expressing its ongoing commitment to On Patrol: Live." Despite the lawsuit, A&E and Big Fish continue to cooperate on production of Court Night Live, a court show which has served as a de facto "spiritual successor" replacement of Live PD. Big Fish Entertainment disputed A&E's allegations of copyright violations, calling the lawsuit "meritless" in a December 2022 court filing.

Release and reception

Broadcast
The series airs on Reelz and premiered on July 22, 2022. It airs weekly on Friday and Saturday's and is broadcast live for three hours from 9:00 p.m.–12:00 a.m. Eastern Time. The premiere episode began broadcasting 70-minutes after its scheduled start time due to technical difficulties. After initially showing dead air, repeated commercials were shown for a documentary about the band Kiss set to air the following Sunday, and ending in two rerun episodes of Jail: Las Vegas. This episode ultimately began airing at 10:15 p.m. and was broadcast in its entirety without television advertisements. The following episode also briefly began with dead air, but the issue was fixed quickly. Reelz signed an agreement with the streaming provider Peacock to carry the channels linear feed live beginning in March 2023. The deal also allows the series as well as First Shift to be streamed on-demand the day after its live broadcast.

Critical response
Writing for The Guardian, Adrian Horton opined that the revival was a "backslide" in policing reform and criticized the lack of need for subjects to sign consent forms due to its categorization as a news organization. Horton also said that despite Abrams declaration of further transparency in the series, no change would be enough to satisfy its flaws.

Writing in the Albuquerque Journal, the paper's editorial board rejected the Bernalillo County Sheriff's Office's view, that for them, On Patrol: Live is "a good way to connect with the community." The editorial board specifically took issue with a segment in which a deputy accompanied by one of the show's camera crews responded to a traffic accident. According to the board an involved party at the scene repeatedly asked not to be filmed, with a deputy supposedly telling them "if you don't want to be in it, turn around". The editorial board opined that the show is "spotlight[ing] crime and victimiz[ing] victims" and that taxpayers risk getting "humiliated on TV and subsequently mocked on social media in the name of entertainment". The editorial board encouraged the Bernalillo County Sheriff's Office Advisory and Review Board to recommend the departments cooperation with On Patrol: Live be ended.

Following the premiere weekend, Brittany Frederick from Comic Book Resources wrote that despite being similar to its predecessor, On Patrol: Live failed to capture the same "frantic energy". She specifically mentioned that Wilson didn't measure up to the former dynamic held between Abrams, Larkin, and Morris. Frederick later explained that she believed the series needed unique elements rather than attempting to be an exact copy of Live PD.

Viewing figures
The series premiered to strong ratings, winning the 25–54 year-old demographic during its first two episodes with 397,000 and 403,000 viewers, respectively. Reelz also reported that had 121 million impressions across social media platforms and trended on Twitter. Throughout the seven telecasts broadcast in its opening weekend, the series achieved a total of 3.5 million viewers. In its second week, the series surpassed viewership of competing Shark Week programming on Discovery Channel and once again won the 25–54 demographic. By August 10, 2022, the series totaled 6.8 million viewers and 1.8 billion minutes throughout its twenty-seven telecasts. At the time of the series first renewal in February 2023, it was averaging over 800,000 same-day viewers an episode. Viewership on Reelz increased 270% in 2022 as a result of On Patrol: Live.

Episodes

On Patrol: First Shift

On Patrol: First Shift is a companion series that serves as a lead-in to each new airing of On Patrol: Live. The series is co-hosted by Abrams, Larkin, and Wilson; the three preview new episodes of the parent series, provide additional analysis on previous episodes, and answer viewer questions.

Episodes

References
Explanatory footnotes

Citations

External links

2020s American crime television series
2020s American reality television series
2022 American television series debuts
American television series revived after cancellation
American television spin-offs
Documentary television series about policing
Law enforcement in the United States
Live PD
Reelz original programming